Mario Fayos (born 2 February 1927) was a Uruguayan sprinter. He competed in the men's 100 metres at the 1948 Summer Olympics.

Competition record

References

External links
 

1927 births
Possibly living people
Athletes (track and field) at the 1948 Summer Olympics
Uruguayan male sprinters
Olympic athletes of Uruguay
Place of birth missing
20th-century Uruguayan people